WOSQ (92.3 FM) is a radio station broadcasting a sports format. Licensed to Spencer, Wisconsin, United States, the station is currently owned by Central Wisconsin Broadcasting, INC. and features programming from ABC Radio, Learfield, and ESPN Radio, and various local programs.

History
The station went on the air as WMJA on 1984-08-02.  On 1990-02-02, the station changed its call sign to WOSX, then changed on 1994-06-01, to the current WOSQ.

References

External links

OSQ
Sports radio stations in the United States